Tamyneoi (before 2001: Ταμιναίοι - Taminaioi, from  Tamynai or Τάμυνα/Τάμινα Tamyna/Tamina) is a former municipality of the island of Euboea, Greece. Since the 2011 local government reform it is part of the municipality Kymi-Aliveri, of which it is a municipal unit. The municipal unit has an area of 203.971 km2. The seat of the municipality was in Aliveri. The name reflects that of the ancient city of Tamynae.

Subdivisions
The municipal unit Tamyneoi is subdivided into the following communities (constituent villages in brackets):
Agios Ioannis (Agios Ioannis, Akti Nireos)
Agios Loukas (Agios Loukas, Paramerites, Prinias)
Aliveri (Aliveri, Anthoupoli, Katakalos, Latas, Milaki)
Gavalas
Partheni (Partheni, Panagia)
Prasino (Prasino, Panagitsa Pounta)
Tharounia
Trachili

Historical population

References

External links
GTP Travel Pages Municipality of Tamyneoi (in English and Greek)

Populated places in Euboea